Gibbonsia montereyensis, the Crevice kelpfish, is a species of clinid found along the Pacific coast of North America from British Columbia, Canada, to Baja California, Mexico where it prefers areas close to the shore amongst algae.  This species can reach a maximum length of  TL.  They tend to be red or orange with white spots or stripes, although other colors and patterns have been observed. This species feeds primarily on polychaete worms. They are poorly studied.

References

montereyensis
Fish described in 1927